Taylor Joseph Featherston (born October 8, 1989) is an American professional baseball infielder who is a free agent. He previously played in Major League Baseball (MLB) for the Los Angeles Angels, Philadelphia Phillies, and Tampa Bay Rays.

Career

Amateur
Featherston graduated from James E. Taylor High School in Katy, Texas. He attended Texas Christian University (TCU), where he played college baseball for the TCU Horned Frogs baseball team. In 2010, he played collegiate summer baseball with the Brewster Whitecaps of the Cape Cod Baseball League.

Colorado Rockies
The Colorado Rockies selected Featherston in the fifth round of the 2011 MLB Draft. In 2014, he played for the Tulsa Drillers of the Class AA Texas League. He had a .260 batting average, 16 home runs, and 57  runs batted in for Tulsa.

Los Angeles Angels
The Chicago Cubs selected Featherston from the Rockies in the 2014 Rule 5 Draft, and then traded him to the Angels for cash considerations. Featherston competed for a role with the Angels as a utility infielder in spring training. The Angels carried Featherston as their backup infielder on their Opening Day roster. He made his major league debut on April 12. Featherston batted .162 during the 2015 season, receiving 154 at bats in 101 games played.

During the 2015-16 offseason, the Angels designated Featherston for assignment.

Philadelphia Phillies
The Philadelphia Phillies acquired Featherston from the Angels for a player to be named later or cash considerations. He began the 2016 season with the Lehigh Valley IronPigs of the Class AAA International League. The Phillies promoted Featherston to the major leagues on July 25. They designated him for assignment on September 10.

Tampa Bay Rays
Featherston began the 2017 season with Lehigh Valley. On June 9, the Phillies traded Featherston to the Tampa Bay Rays for cash considerations. He batted .179 for the Rays, and also played for the Durham Bulls of the International League.

Minnesota Twins
In December 2017, Featherston signed a minor league contract with the Minnesota Twins. He was released on June 18, 2018.

Kansas City T-Bones
On June 25, 2018, Featherston signed with the Kansas City T-Bones of the independent American Association.

Cincinnati Reds
On July 24, 2018, Featherston's contract was purchased by the Cincinnati Reds organization. He was assigned to the Double-A Pensacola Blue Wahoos. Featherston elected free agency on November 2, 2018.

Kansas City Royals
On January 3, 2019, Featherston signed a minor league contract with the Kansas City Royals. He became a free agent following the 2019 season.

Seattle Mariners
On April 6, 2022, after spending the past two years out of baseball, Featherston signed a minor league contract with the Seattle Mariners organization. He elected free agency on November 10, 2022.

Personal life
On April 6, 2020, Featherston married Taylor (née Lowery).

References

External links

1989 births
Living people
Baseball players from Houston
Major League Baseball infielders
Los Angeles Angels players
Philadelphia Phillies players
Tampa Bay Rays players
TCU Horned Frogs baseball players
Brewster Whitecaps players
Tri-City Dust Devils players
Asheville Tourists players
Modesto Nuts players
Tulsa Drillers players
Salt River Rafters players
Lehigh Valley IronPigs players
Salt Lake Bees players
Tigres del Licey players
American expatriate baseball players in the Dominican Republic
Durham Bulls players
Rochester Red Wings players
Kansas City T-Bones players
Pensacola Blue Wahoos players
Northwest Arkansas Naturals players
Omaha Storm Chasers players